The Rižana is a river in Slovenia.  It has also been known as the Risano.  It was known as the Formio in Latin.

Geography
The village of Rižana is located upon it. Its mouth is on or near the Gulf of Trieste of the Adriatic Sea. The Škocjan Lagoon Nature Reserve is a park area of wetlands where the Rižana and Badaševica rivers used to flow into the sea.

Name
The Rižana was attested in historical sources as Rusano  670, Riziano  804, Risano in 1135, and Garzignana in 1569, among other spellings. The origin of the name is pre-Slavic and is probably related to the Illyrian toponym Ῥιζάνα Rhizana, reflected in the Montenegrin toponym Risan. The name is probably derived from the Proto-Indo-European root *erei̯H- 'to flow'.

References

Rivers of the Slovene Littoral